The 102nd district of the Texas House of Representatives consists of portions of Dallas, Garland, and Richardson in Dallas County. The current Representative is Ana-Maria Ramos, who has represented the district since 2019.

References 

102